Ludmila Aslanian (Lyudmila Aslanyan, ; born 2 July 1954) is an Armenian chess player with the title of  Woman International Master (WIM). She is a five time Armenian Women Chess Championship winner (1984, 1986, 1987, 1991, 1992).

Career
Aslanian competed at the 30th Chess Olympiad on board one for Armenia, the first Chess Olympiad of the country. That same year, she also played on board one for the debut of Armenia at the European Team Chess Championship 1992. Aslanian participated at the 31st Chess Olympiad again with Armenia on board two. She also represented the Armenian SSR on board one at the 2nd Soviet Women's Team Chess Championship 1991.

References

External links
 
 
 
 

1954 births
Living people
Chess Woman International Masters
Ukrainian female chess players
Armenian female chess players
Ukrainian people of Armenian descent
Chess Olympiad competitors